Luke McDaniel (February 3, 1927 – June 27, 1992), who also recorded under the stage name Jeff Daniels, was an American country and rockabilly music singer and songwriter. He was the grandfather of Mississippi state senator Chris McDaniel.

Biography
McDaniel was born in Laurel, Mississippi and raised on a farm. He learned to play mandolin in high school, playing in local churches and public events. In 1945, he formed his own band, which opened for Hank Williams at a show in New Orleans in 1950. In 1952, he auditioned for Trumpet Records, but was initially turned down for a recording session. After Trumpet label head Lillian McMurry asked him to return with better songwriting material, he wrote "This Crying Heart", modeled after Williams's hit "Your Cheatin' Heart", which convinced McMurry to sign him for a recording contract. He recorded three songs with Jimmy Swan's backing band, including the single "Whoa Boy", which Trumpet issued later in 1952; the song became a regional hit in New Orleans. Following Williams's death, McDaniel wrote a song titled "A Tribute to Hank Williams, My Buddy"; Trumpet released the single with low fidelity mastering, and it did not sell well.

He then moved to Mobile, Alabama and played with Jack Cardwell, a star on local radio and television station WKAB. He became a regular on the "Tom 'N Jack" show, and in 1953 Cardwell's label, King Records, signed him. He recorded several singles for King, the most successful of which was "Drive In". On the strength of his releases on Trumpet and King, he was invited to play on the radio program Louisiana Hayride. He moved to New Orleans in 1954, where he also recorded for Mel-A-Dee Records.

In 1956, he was persuaded by friends Elvis Presley and Carl Perkins to send a demo recording to Sam Phillips, who signed him to his label Sun Records. McDaniel recorded two sessions with Sun, but left the label over a contract dispute. None of the Sun sides were released until Charly Records compiled them decades later.

Following this, he signed with Big Howdy Records and released records under the name Jeff Daniel, but was unable to score a hit record under this name, either. He continued recording into the 1970s.

Legacy
Buddy Holly performed his song "Midnight Shift" (written under the pseudonym Earl Lee), and The Byrds covered his "You're Still on My Mind" on their album Sweetheart of the Rodeo. George Jones and Jim Reeves also covered McDaniel's songs.

Discography

Singles
as Luke McDaniel or Luke McDaniels

as Jeff Daniels

Compilation album
 1996 – Daddy-O-Rock – The Rock And Country Sides Of: Luke McDaniel, Hydra Records

References

External links
Luke McDaniel at Hillbilly-Music.com
LUKE McDANIEL a.k.a. JEFF DANIELS (By Shaun Mather)

American country singer-songwriters
Singer-songwriters from Mississippi
People from Laurel, Mississippi
Trumpet Records artists
King Records artists
1927 births
1992 deaths
20th-century American singers
Country musicians from Mississippi